The 2009 Categoría Primera B season, officially known as the 2009 Copa Premier season for sponsorship reasons) was the 20th season since its founding as Colombia's second division football league.

Teams 
 Starting from this season, Córdoba moved from Cereté to Sincelejo and was rebranded as Atlético de la Sabana, while Girardot moved to Palmira and became Deportes Palmira.
 Dépor moved from Jamundí to Cali, and Expreso Rojo moved from Fusagasugá to Zipaquirá.

Torneo Apertura

First stage

Group A

Group B

Semifinals

Group A

Group B

Finals

Tied 3–3 on aggregate, Cortuluá won on penalties.

Torneo Finalización

First stage

Group A

Group B

Semifinals

Group A

Group B

Finals

Atlético Bucaramanga won 3–2 on aggregate.

Championship final

Cortuluá won 4–1 on aggregate.

Promotion/relegation playoff
As the second worst team in the 2009 Categoría Primera A relegation table, Deportivo Pereira had to play a two-legged tie against Atlético Bucaramanga, the Primera B runners-up. As the Primera A team, Deportivo Pereira played the second leg at home. The winner competed in the Primera A for the 2009 season, while the loser competed in the Primera B.

External links
Colombia 2009 - RSSSF

Categoría Primera B seasons
2009 in Colombian football
Colombia

es:Categoría Primera B
pl:Categoría Primera B